The Other Life of Captain Contreras Spanish:La otra vida del capitán Contreras) is a 1955 Spanish comedy film directed by Rafael Gil.

Synopsis
Spain, 16th century: The brave captain Alonso Contreras is menaced by the inquisition, but he is not guilty. An alchemist, trying to help, gives Alonso a powerful potion in order to make him sleep until the danger flies. The potion is too much powerful and Alonso wakes up in the 20th century.

The plot is similar to Mel Gibson's film Forever Young.

Cast

References

Bibliography
 de España, Rafael. Directory of Spanish and Portuguese film-makers and films. Greenwood Press, 1994.

External links 

1955 films
1950s historical comedy films
Spanish historical comedy films
1950s Spanish-language films
Films directed by Rafael Gil
Films set in the 16th century
Suevia Films films
Films scored by Juan Quintero Muñoz
Films produced by Cesáreo González
Spanish black-and-white films
1950s Spanish films